Mitchelton–BikeExchange was a Chinese UCI Continental cycling team established in 2017. It was set up as a development team for the UCI WorldTeam .

In January 2018 the team announced that BikeExchange would join the team as a co-naming sponsor.  The team folded at the end of the 2019 season.

2019 Team roster
Ages  as of 31 December 2019

Major wins
2017
Stage 5b (ITT) Girobio, Lucas Hamilton
Stage 7 Girobio, Jai Hindley
 Overall Tour of Fuzhou, Jai Hindley
1st Stage 4, Jai Hindley

2018
 U23 National Time Trial Championships, Callum Scotson
Giro del Belvedere, Robert Stannard
Stage 7 Le Tour de Bretagne Cycliste, Robert Stannard
Stage 9b (ITT) Giro Ciclistico d'Italia, Robert Stannard
Stage 13 Tour of Qinghai Lake, Kaden Groves
Gran Premio di Poggiana, Robert Stannard
Il Piccolo Lombardia, Robert Stannard
Stage 1 Tour of Quanzhou Bay, Kaden Groves
Stage 5 Tour of Fuzhou, Kaden Groves

National Champions
2018
 Australia U23 Time Trial, Callum Scotson

References

UCI Continental Teams (Asia)
Cycling teams established in 2017
Cycling teams based in China